Little Samson is a 1992 platform game developed by Takeru and published by Taito for the Nintendo Entertainment System. It was released in Japan on June 26, 1992, in North America on October 22, 1992, and in Europe on March 18, 1993.

Gameplay 

The game's setup reminiscent of Mega Man by Capcom. The player jumps with the A button and attacks, usually in the form of a projectile, with the B button. The character's health is shown by a series of bars, stacked vertically, to the left side of the screen. Throughout the stages the characters must defeat enemies and avoid pits, all the while collecting standard power-ups including one ups, energy-replenishing hearts, and spheres which increase the capacity of the character's health meter.

The two choices of gameplay the player may choose (Easy, Normal) dictates the level of difficulty. If the player chooses Normal mode, several changes will occur in comparison to if the player chooses Easy. Characters have a limit to how much their health meter may extend (about half of their maximum in Easy mode). Levels will also sport more enemies in Normal mode, and should the player die playing with either the dragon, golem, or mouse, that character will no longer be selectable until the player either uses a potion on them or beats the level. Little Samson on the other hand is always playable, and because of which, he alone can complete almost all the levels alone (exceptions being the introductory levels and the very last level).

An uncommon feature of the game is that the player may switch characters at any point during the level. Each character has their own health gauge, but they all share the same “lives” (if the character which the player is using dies, then they lose a life and all heroes' health gauges are restored). When confronted the boss's health is displayed in a similar fashion to the player's but on the right side of the screen. There are two kinds of boss battles: regular bosses, and the dark prince's 4 henchmen. Normal boss battles consist of one fight against a creature Samson and company encounter along the way. A henchman boss battle, however, consists of two phases: their cloaked form, and the boss's true form (typically a large monster). After defeating the boss the player is shown their password.

Plot 
A dark prince is freed from his seal by a thunderstorm, and begins to try to take over the world. The kingdom is in peril, and the King orders that the four heroes receive a summon. Four pigeons fly off to meet these heroes, and each reads the summon. From here, the player must navigate all four of these heroes through an introductory course.

From here, the strengths of individual characters must be utilized to get through a variety of courses. Several bosses await the heroes, and it is up to the player's strategy to choose which hero(es) will fight the boss. A few levels have branching exits, taking the player to different levels, although each one ends up taking the player to stages marked by skulls on the map. Here, the player fights one of the four wizards that serve as the dark prince's right-hand men, each of which shapeshifts into a larger boss when defeated (Green shapeshifts into a Cyclops, Blue shapeshifts into a magic-wielding knight, Red shapeshifts into a giant dragon, and Yellow shapeshifts into what appears to be the Grim Reaper).

Eventually, the player reaches what appears to be the dark prince's castle, and faces a golden wizard-knight at the end (which shapeshifts into a demonic skull). If the game is played on Easy, this is the final level. If played on Normal, the dark prince's true stronghold — a castle resting on a giant, green skull — arises, and the game continues for a few more levels, ending with a confrontation with the dark prince himself. In the end, through the utilization of all four characters, the kingdom is saved. All story development is shown through pantomimed animated cutscenes.

Characters 
Throughout the game the player operates one of four characters, each with their own strengths and weaknesses. The first four stages are each dedicated to a specific character, but upon their completion the player can swap characters at any time for the remainder of the game, and often must do so in order to complete the level. The four characters are as follows:

Samson, for whom the game is named, is the young human protagonist. He is a young warrior with a kind heart and is the only character in the game playable who isn't cursed or turned into a different form. He is a small, quick character who attacks enemies by throwing bells. He is able to jump higher and further than most characters and has the ability to climb on the walls and ceilings.
 Kikira is the second hero. Originally a princess of a small kingdom, she was cursed to be a female dragon. As a dragoness, she has the ability to fly for brief periods of time, making her a valuable character in many jumping-oriented stages. She attacks by spitting fire, which travels in a J-shaped arc. The player can increase the strength of her flame by holding down the B button for longer periods of time (if Kikira is green, then the fireball will be small; if purple it will be medium-sized; if pink, it will be large). She is initially hostile to the idea of Samson being the leader and fights him for dominance, but upon her defeat she relinquishes. 
 Gamm is the third hero. Originally a thief and stealer, he grabbed a potion from KO's lab and tried to flee. After drinking the potion he turned into a gigantic rock monster beast with a gigantic punching arm. Big and bulky, he is the slowest of all the characters but his punch is stronger than any of the other characters' attacks. His size is both a benefit (he takes the least damage from enemy attacks, no damage from spikes, and starts with more health than the other characters) and a hindrance (his jumping ability is severely stunted). He is also the only character who can attack in all four cardinal directions.
 K.O. is the fourth hero. Originally a kind and curious wizard he accidentally turned into a mouse while chasing after Gamm when he stole the potion from his lab. He has the least health of any character, but is very quick and a great jumper, and is small enough to traverse some narrow passages that are otherwise inaccessible. Just like Samson he has the ability to climb on the walls and ceiling. He is unique in that he attacks by placing bombs.

Development and release 
The game is directed by Shinichi Yoshimoto, who had previously worked on Strider and Ghouls 'n Ghosts. One of the artist for the game was Takashi "Utata Kiyoshi" Kogure.

It was released in North America in October 1992 and at the time went virtually unknown with little promotion and sold very poorly. As a result, the North American version of the game has since become an expensive collector's item.

Reception 

AllGame editor Skyler Miller described Little Samson as one of the best platformers on the NES, touting it as a "tour de force of excellent game design, attractive graphics, and pure entertainment value". He also described the game's stages as "challenging and creatively designed". Public reception was also positive; Japanese readers of Famimaga voted to give it a 21.2 out of 30 score, indicating a popular following. In 2009, IGN placed the title on their "Top 100 NES Games" list at #93.

Notes

References

External links 
 Little Samson at GameFAQs
 Little Samson at Giant Bomb
 Little Samson at MobyGames

1992 video games
Fantasy video games
Fictional golems
Nintendo Entertainment System games
Nintendo Entertainment System-only games
Platform games
Single-player video games
Taito games
Video games about dragons
Video games about mice and rats
Video games developed in Japan